Edward M. Cotter is a fireboat in use by the Buffalo Fire Department at Buffalo, New York, United States. Originally named William S. Grattan, it was built in 1900 by the Crescent Shipyard of Elizabeth Port, New Jersey.  Due to age, it was rebuilt in 1953 and renamed Firefighter upon its return to service. The following year it was renamed Edward M. Cotter. its namesake, Edward Cotter, was a Buffalo firefighter and leader of the local firefighters union who had recently died.

Edward M. Cotter is considered to be the oldest active fireboat in the world and was designated a National Historic Landmark in 1996. Along with its firefighting duties, during the winter Edward M. Cotter is used as an icebreaker on Buffalo's rivers. Edward M. Cotter mounts five fire monitors that are capable of pumping . It can often be seen sailing out of its berth and south-west to Lake Erie, returning north through the breakwall and firing its fire monitors.

Construction

The ship that was to become Edward M. Cotter was built in 1900 by the Crescent Shipyard of Elizabeth Port, New Jersey. She was originally named William S. Grattan after the first paid fire commissioner for the city of Buffalo. Construction was started on March 24, 1900 and she was christened on September 1, 1900 by Lucia Virginia Malone, the nine year old daughter of one of the city's fire commissioners. The final construction cost for the ship was $91,000.

A -thick belt-line of Swedish steel was included around the hull for icebreaking duties. A single propeller provided propulsion.

Two of the fire monitors were mounted on the forward section of the ship and one was on the stern section.

History

At the beginning of the twentieth century, Buffalo's waterfront was an extremely busy center of commerce. Grain elevators, warehouses and shipping traffic had overtaxed the two existing fireboats: John T. Hutchinson (Engine 23) and George R. Potter (Engine 29). Also, the city of Buffalo had shoreline hookups to allow the fireboats to serve as floating pumping stations supplying high pressure water to a fire hydrant system that covered the downtown area.  The decision was made by city officials to order a third boat that would also have icebreaking capability along with her normal firefighting duties.

Upon completion she traveled up the Atlantic coast, down the St. Lawrence River, across Lake Ontario, through the Welland Canal and finally across Lake Erie in an uneventful trip that took 14 days. She was met  out of the harbor by her sister fireboats and escorted in.

1928 fire
On July 28, 1928 William S. Grattan responded to the oil barge James F. Cahill, loaded with 5,000 barrels of crude oil, that was aflame in the Buffalo River at Elk Street while docked at the Atlas Refinery. Thirty-five fire companies, the Grattan and another fireboat battled the blaze. After burning 17 hours, the barge's mooring lines gave way and the barge began to drift following a series of four explosions. William S. Grattans crew attempted to attach tow lines to the drifting barge but it struck a dock at an oil company where the empty oil tanker B.B. McColl was moored. The fumes on the B.B. McColl ignited causing an explosion and fire that engulfed William S. Grattan. Captain Thomas Hylant along with his crew abandoned ship and swam through the flames to shore. Chief Engineer Thomas Lynch of William S. Grattan lost his life after abandoning ship and seven other crew members were injured. The unattended boilers on William S. Grattan soon ran dry and exploded, leaving the ship burned out to the waterline and heavily damaged.

William S. Grattan sat boarded-up for eighteen months while city and fire department officials decided whether to replace her at a cost of $225,000  or rebuild her for $99,000, which was $8,000 more than her original cost. The decision was made to rebuild and in 1930 she was rebuilt at the Buffalo Dry Dock Company of Buffalo, New York. During this refit some improvements were made to William S. Grattan. One improvement was that her boilers were converted from burning coal to burning oil. The engines were rebuilt and her firefighting system was updated and could now handle foam fire retardant. Also, the pilot house was raised to the upper boat deck level and a fixed turret tower with a fire monitor was constructed on the stern of the ship. A fourth fire monitor was added to the top of the pilot house of the ship as well. As part of her acceptance ceremony she participated in a race against the harbor tug Kentucky, which was considered to be one of the fastest tugs on the Great Lakes.

1953 refit
In the early 1950s, it was noticed that William S. Grattan was showing signs of age. Her boilers were only able to operate at 40 percent capacity and an engine room steam leak in 1951 injured part of her crew. During November 1952, William S. Grattan was sent to the Sturgeon Bay Shipbuilding & Dry Dock Company of Sturgeon Bay, Wisconsin for a refit.

During this refit her boilers and steam engines were replaced by diesel engines, the pumps for the firefighting system were replaced, the single propeller was replaced with twin propellers, the fixed firefighting platform was replaced with a hydraulically operated platform and the twin funnels were replaced with lower dummy funnels. Upon her return in 1954, she was renamed Firefighter. In 1955 she was renamed again in honor of Edward M. Cotter, a respected Buffalo firefighter and the leader of the local firefighters union, who had recently died. After the refit Edward M. Cotter mounted five fire monitors capable of pumping .

International firefighting

On October 7, 1960 Edward M. Cotter came to the aid of firefighting authorities in Port Colborne, Ontario, Canada. Two days previously, on October 5, 1960, a set of grain elevators caught fire at the eight-story Maple Leaf Milling Company. The Port Colborne Fire Department did not have its own fireboat and they were unable to bring the fire under control. The Buffalo Fire Department was asked to send Edward M. Cotter to lend assistance. Escorted by a United States Coast Guard cutter, because she had never needed navigational equipment of her own, Edward M. Cotter proceeded across the international border.  The voyage to Port Colborne took two hours with an additional four hours needed to bring the fire under control. This mission is said to have been the first instance that a United States fire boat had crossed an international border to help authorities in another country.

Notable rescues
In 1978 , a retired United States Naval guided missile cruiser on display at the Buffalo and Erie County Naval & Military Park, began taking on water and listing. Edward M. Cotter and several Buffalo Fire Department fire engines pumped water out of Little Rock for five days keeping the ship afloat and level while repairs were made. Edward M. Cotter also assisted the disabled United States Coast Guard cutter Ojibwa during the winter of 1983. Ojibwa, while on Lake Erie, had lost her steering and was taking on water. Edward M. Cotter towed Ojibwa to her base in Buffalo and helped keep her afloat while repairs were made. Another rescue occurred on July 31, 1984 when Edward M. Cotter  towed the Polish tall ship Zawisza Czarny off a sand bar during the ship's visit to Buffalo.

Heritage
As commerce declined on Buffalo's waterfront, Edward M. Cotter was transferred from the Buffalo Fire Department to the Public Works Department in 1992 for icebreaking duties. In 1996 Edward M. Cotter was designated a National Historic Landmark. and was transferred back to the Buffalo Fire Department in 1997.

A non-profit group named "Friends of the Cotter", founded in 2005, has been running fund-raising events to overhaul Edward M. Cotter. Along with her normal duties Edward M. Cotter has been sent to various festivals and boat shows around the Great Lakes.

Other fire boats

Edward Cotter is one of a few fireboats to ply the Great Lakes:

 William Lyon Mackenzie is operated by Toronto Fire Services and operates in Lake Ontario.
 Curtis Randolph is operated by Detroit Fire Department and operates in the Detroit River

See also

 List of National Historic Landmarks in New York
List of U.S. National Historic Landmark ships, shipwrecks, and shipyards
 History of Buffalo, New York

References

External links

History of the E. M. Cotter
Interactive 360° VR tour of the E. M. Cotter
Edward Cotter
Buffalo's Enchanted Fireboat
Friends of the Cotter Official Website

Ships of the United States
Fireboats of the United States
Great Lakes ships
Historic American Engineering Record in New York (state)
Buffalo Fire Department
Icebreakers of the United States
Maritime incidents in 1928
Maritime incidents in the United States
National Historic Landmarks in New York (state)
Ship fires
Ships built in Elizabeth, New Jersey
Ships on the National Register of Historic Places in New York (state)
1900 ships
National Register of Historic Places in Buffalo, New York
History of Buffalo, New York